The Jaufen Pass (el. 2,094 m.) is a high mountain pass in the Alps in the South Tyrol in Italy.

It connects Meran and Sterzing on the road to the Brenner Pass. It is the northernmost pass in the Alps that is completely in Italy. The pass road is very winding, with many switchbacks.

Gallery

See also
 List of highest paved roads in Europe
 List of mountain passes

External links 

Mountain passes of the Alps
Mountain passes of South Tyrol
Rhaetian Alps